The Bras de l'Enfer is a tributary of the rivière à Mars, flowing in the unorganized territory of Lac-Ministuk, in the Le Fjord-du-Saguenay Regional County Municipality, in the administrative region of Saguenay–Lac-Saint-Jean, in the province of Quebec, in Canada. The upper part of the course of the "Bras de l'Enfer" crosses the northern part of the Laurentides Wildlife Reserve.

A few other secondary forest roads serve the Bras de l'Enfer valley, mainly for forestry and recreational tourism activities.

Forestry is the main economic activity in this valley; recreational tourism, second.

The surface of the Bras de l'Enfer is usually frozen from the beginning of December to the end of March, however the safe circulation on the ice is generally made from mid-December to mid-March.

Geography 
The Bras de l'Enfer rises at the mouth of Lake Trema. This source is located at:
  north-east of "Lac du Moulin" which is the head lake of rivière du Moulin;
  west of the course of the rivière à Mars;
  south of the confluence of the Arm of Hell and the rivière à Mars;
  northwest of Lac Marchand;
  south-west of Lake Ha! Ha!.

  to the west, in particular by crossing Gilson lake and Villeneuve lake, the south-eastern part of which is surrounded by marshes, to the mouth of the latter;
  towards the north-west, crossing lac de l'Enfer, to its mouth;
  north-east to a bend in the river, then branching north-east to the outlet (coming from the south-east) of Lake Georges;
  towards the north-east by leveling  and bypassing by the northeast a mountain whose summit reaches , to a mountain stream (coming from the south);
  towards the south-east by forming a curve towards the north, followed by a curve towards the south, until its mouth.

The Bras de l'Enfer pours down on the east bank of the rivière à Mars. This confluence is located at:
  north-east of Lake Georges;
  north-east of a curve in the course of the rivière du Moulin;
  west of the course of the Rivière à Pierre;
  west of a mountain peak;
  south of the confluence of the rivière à Mars and Baie des Ha! Ha!.

From the confluence of the Bras de l'Enfer with the rivière à Mars, the current follows the course of the rivière à Mars on  generally towards the north, crosses the Baie des Ha!

Toponymy 
The toponym "bras de l'Enfer" was formalized on December 5, 1968, at the Place Names Bank of the Commission de toponymie du Québec.

See also 

 Le Fjord-du-Saguenay Regional County Municipality
 Lac-Ministuk, a TNO
 Laurentides Wildlife Reserve
 Lac de l'Enfer
 Rivière à Mars
 Baie des Ha! Ha!
 Saguenay River
 List of rivers of Quebec

References 

Rivers of Saguenay–Lac-Saint-Jean
Le Fjord-du-Saguenay Regional County Municipality
Laurentides Wildlife Reserve